The  are a group of Japanese poets of the Asuka, Nara, and Heian periods selected by Fujiwara no Kintō as exemplars of Japanese poetic ability. The oldest surviving collection of the 36 poets' works is Nishi Honganji Sanju-rokunin Kashu ("Nishi Honganji 36 poets collection") of 1113. This list superseded an older group called the Six Immortals of Poetry.

Sets of portraits (essentially imaginary) of the group were popular in Japanese painting and later woodblock prints, and often hung in temples.

Kintō's Thirty-Six Immortals of Poetry

 Kakinomoto no Hitomaro
 Ki no Tsurayuki 
 Ōshikōchi Mitsune 
 Lady Ise 
 Ōtomo no Yakamochi 
 Yamabe no Akahito 
 Ariwara no Narihira 
 Henjō 
 Sosei 
 Ki no Tomonori 
 Sarumaru no Taifu 
 Ono no Komachi 
 Fujiwara no Kanesuke 
 Fujiwara no Asatada 
 Fujiwara no Atsutada 
 Fujiwara no Takamitsu 
 Minamoto no Kintada 
 Mibu no Tadamine
 Saigū no Nyōgo 
 Ōnakatomi no Yorimoto 
 Fujiwara no Toshiyuki
 Minamoto no Shigeyuki
 Minamoto no Muneyuki 
 Minamoto no Saneakira 
 Fujiwara no Kiyotada 
 Minamoto no Shitagō
 Fujiwara no Okikaze 
 Kiyohara no Motosuke
 Sakanoue no Korenori
 Fujiwara no Motozane
 Ōnakatomi no Yoshinobu 
 Fujiwara no Nakafumi 
 Taira no Kanemori 
 Mibu no Tadami 
 Kodai no Kimi 
 Nakatsukasa

Thirty-Six Female Immortals of Poetry
Main article↗︎

, composed in the Kamakura period, refers to thirty-six female immortals of poetry:

 Ono no Komachi
 Ise
 Nakatsukasa
 Kishi Joō
 Ukon
 Fujiwara no Michitsuna no Haha
 Uma no Naishi
 Akazome Emon
 Izumi Shikibu
 Kodai no Kimi
 Murasaki Shikibu
 Koshikibu no Naishi
 Ise no Taifu
 Sei Shōnagon
 Daini no Sanmi
 Takashina no Kishi
 Yūshi Naishinnō-ke no Kii
 Sagami
 Shikishi Naishinnō
 Kunai-kyō
 Suō no Naishi
 Fujiwara no Toshinari no Musume
 Taikenmon'in no Horikawa
 Gishūmon'in no Tango
 Kayōmon'in no Echizen
 Nijōin no Sanuki
 Kojijū
 Go-Toba-in no Shimotsuke
 Ben no Naishi
 Gofukakusa-in no shōshō no naishi
 Inpumon'in no Tayū
 Tsuchimikado In no Kosaishō
 Hachijō-in Takakura
 Fujiwara no Chikako
 Shikikenmon'in no Mikushige
 Sōhekimon'in no Shōshō

New Thirty-Six Immortals of Poetry 

There are at least two groups of Japanese poets called :
 One selected by Fujiwara no Mototoshi (Heian period)
 One including poets mainly of the Kamakura period; who selected this is unknown.
The term usually refers to the second:

 Emperor Go-Toba
 Emperor Tsuchimikado
 Emperor Juntoku
 Emperor Go-Saga
 Prince Masanari of Rokujō-no-Miya
 Prince Munetaka of Kamakura-no-Miya
 Prince Dōjonyūdō
 Prince Shikishi
 Kujō Yoshitsune
 Kujō Michiie
 Saionji Kintsune
 Koga Michiteru
 Saionji Saneuji
 Minamoto no Sanetomo
 Kujō Motoie
 Fujiwara no Ieyoshi
 Jien
 Gyōi
 Minamoto no Michitomo (Horikawa Michitomo)
 Fujiwara no Sadaie
 Hachijō-in Takakura
 Shunzei's Daughter
 Go-Toba-in Kunaikyō
 Sōheki Mon'in no Shōshō
 Fujiwara no Tameie
 Asukai Masatsune
 Fujiwara no Ietaka
 Fujiwara no Tomoie
 Fujiwara no Ariie
 Hamuro Mitsutoshi
 Fujiwara no Nobuzane
 Minamoto no Tomochika
 Fujiwara no Takasuke
 Minamoto no Ienaga
 Kamo no Chōmei
 Fujiwara no Hideyoshi

Late Classical Thirty-Six Immortals of Poetry

:ja:中古三十六歌仙

See also
 Rokkasen
Nishi Honganji Sanju-rokunin Kashu

References

External links

Poem Scroll of Thirty-Six Immortal Poets
Arts of Japan exhibit

+
36 Immortals of Poetry
Waka (poetry)
Emperor Go-Toba